Minuscule 150 (in the Gregory-Aland numbering), ε 107 (Soden), is a Greek minuscule manuscript of the New Testament, on parchment leaves. Palaeographically it has been assigned to the 11th century. The manuscript has complex contents, with full marginalia.

Description 

The codex contains a complete text of the four Gospels on 331 parchment leaves (size ).

Written in one column per page, in 23 lines per page. The capital letters are in gold. 
The text is divided according to the Ammonian Sections, whose numbers are given at the margin, with references to the Eusebian Canons (written below Ammonian Section numbers).

Text 

The Greek text of the codex is a representative of the Byzantine text-type. Hermann von Soden classified it to the textual family Kx. Aland placed it in Category V.

According to the Claremont Profile Method it belongs to the textual family Family Kx in Luke 1 and Luke 10. In Luke 20 it has mixed Byzantine text related to family Π200.

History 

Birch dated the manuscript to the 12th century. Currently the INTF dated it to the 11th century.

The manuscript was examined and described by Birch (about 1782) and Scholz. C. R. Gregory saw it in 1886.

It is currently housed at the Vatican Library (Pal. gr. 189), at Rome.

See also 

 List of New Testament minuscules
 Biblical manuscript
 Textual criticism

References

Further reading

External links 
 

Greek New Testament minuscules
11th-century biblical manuscripts
Manuscripts of the Vatican Library